Ridge Road Historic District is a national historic district located near Nollville, Berkeley County, West Virginia. It encompasses six contributing buildings and two contributing sites, related to the early settlement and economic development along Apple Pie Ridge.  They buildings are the: Harriett Lyle Henshaw House, Smith Miller House (1850s), Philip Pendleton House (c. 1785), Noll-Rentch House, and Noll House (c. 1780). The Isabella Lyle House (1802) burned in a fire on February 28, 1999.

It was listed on the National Register of Historic Places in 1980.

References

Historic districts in Berkeley County, West Virginia
Houses in Berkeley County, West Virginia
Houses on the National Register of Historic Places in West Virginia
Historic districts on the National Register of Historic Places in West Virginia
National Register of Historic Places in Berkeley County, West Virginia